A pepper-spray projectile, also called a pepper-spray ball, pepper-ball, pepper bomb, or pepper-spray pellet is a frangible projectile containing a powdered chemical that irritates the eyes and nose in a manner similar to pepper spray. These projectiles are fired from specially designed forced compliance weapons or modified paintball guns.

Description

A pepper-spray projectile may be a sphere, hence the name pepper-ball, but it may also come in other shapes. The irritant payload may differ from product to product but is usually a powder, less frequently a liquid, gas or aerosol. Some companies offer different substances as payload for their projectiles and launcher systems, so potential sellers can choose a substance that is certified for use in their country. Also, projectiles with an inert dummy payload are often offered, for training and testing purposes.

A powder called PAVA (capsaicin II) pepper is often used. PAVA is a capsaicinoid that can be synthesized for cheaper than grown peppers, although it is also found in nature.

Pepper-spray weapons systems are used by law enforcement, military and other organizations, and individuals. The weapon is used generally in the role of stand-off weapons, where physical proximity to a suspect is deemed dangerous but deadly force is not warranted.  The systems are not limited to classic standoff situations and allow agents to apply as many rounds as required to bring individual suspects, multiple suspects, or crowds into compliance.

Other uses 
The projectile is usually sold to be used with a launcher or gun by the same company, to provide best reliability. The different companies usually also sell other types of projectiles for non-lethal use or projectiles with combined effects. Such effects may include:
break glass and disperse barricades
mark suspects for later round-ups
force of impact effect

Lethality 
Although generally considered less-than-lethal when properly used (targets should exclude the face, eyes, throat or spine), one death has occurred when they have been fired at inappropriate areas. In one well-publicized incident in 2004, the Boston Police Department's use of an FN 303 during a crowd control situation resulted in the fatal shooting of Victoria Snelgrove, when the projectile struck her in the eye. 
In 2004, University of California, Davis (UC Davis) police who wanted to break up a block party shot a pepperball at an unarmed student, damaged his eye—the student subsequently lost his athletic scholarship and dropped out of college. In 2012, a federal appeals court ruled that the police could be sued over the incident. In 2013, the student was awarded $774,000.

References 

Non-lethal projectiles
Chemical weapons
Lachrymatory agents
Riot control agents